"G'day G'day" is a song by Australian country singer Slim Dusty. The song was released in August 1988 as the lead single from Dusty's studio album of the same name. The song peaked at number 37 on the ARIA Charts. The song has since been covered numerous times on various Australian compilation albums.

The song won Country Song of the Year and Comedy/Novelty Song of the Year at the 1989 Tamworth Songwriters Awards.

In 2014, IGA Supermarkets celebrated Australia Day with its new campaign "Say G'day Day" which was supported by the release of a modern version of "G'day G'day".

Track listing

Weekly charts

Release history

References 

Slim Dusty songs
1980 songs